Ekarma (Japanese 越渇磨島; Ekaruma-tō) is an uninhabited volcanic island near the center of the Kuril Islands chain in the Sea of Okhotsk in the northwest Pacific Ocean,  separated from Shiashkotan by the Ekarma Strait. Its name is derived from the Ainu language, from “safe anchorage”.

Geology

Lava flows radiate in all directly from the central peak, forming an uneven shoreline. Numerous hot springs with sulphur deposits are on the northern slopes of the mountain. The last eruption of the mountain was in May 1980, during which ash emissions reaching a height of one kilometer were observed from a fishing vessel.

History
Ekarma was visited by hunting and fishing parties of Ainu at the time of European contact, but was not permanently settled as it has no sources of fresh water aside from rainfall. The island appears on an official map showing the territories of Matsumae Domain, a feudal domain of Edo period Japan dated 1644, and these holdings were officially confirmed by the Tokugawa shogunate in 1744.  Subsequently, claimed by the Empire of Russia, sovereignty initially passed to Russia under the terms of the Treaty of Shimoda, but was returned to the Empire of Japan per the Treaty of Saint Petersburg along with the rest of the Kuril islands. The island was formerly administered as part of Shimushu District of Nemuro Subprefecture of Hokkaidō. In 1893, a settlement was attempted by nine members of the Chishima Protective Society led by Gunji Shigetada; however, the colony failed when five of the nine members died in an accident while fishing. After World War II, the island came under the control of the Soviet Union, and is now administered as part of the Sakhalin Oblast of the Russian Federation.

See also
List of volcanoes in Russia

References

External links

Further reading 
 Gorshkov, G. S. Volcanism and the Upper Mantle Investigations in the Kurile Island Arc. Monographs in geoscience. New York: Plenum Press, 1970. 
 Krasheninnikov, Stepan Petrovich, and James Greive. The History of Kamtschatka and the Kurilski Islands, with the Countries Adjacent. Chicago: Quadrangle Books, 1963. 
 Rees, David. The Soviet Seizure of the Kuriles. New York: Praeger, 1985.  
 Takahashi, Hideki, and Masahiro Ōhara. Biodiversity and Biogeography of the Kuril Islands and Sakhalin. Bulletin of the Hokkaido University Museum, no. 2-. Sapporo, Japan: Hokkaido University Museum, 2004.

Notes

Active volcanoes
Islands of the Sea of Okhotsk
Islands of the Russian Far East
Stratovolcanoes of Russia
Islands of the Kuril Islands
Uninhabited islands of Russia
Uninhabited islands of the Pacific Ocean
Volcanoes of the Kuril Islands
Mountains of the Kuril Islands
Holocene stratovolcanoes